USS SC-131, sometimes styled as either Submarine Chaser No. 131 or S.C.-131, was an  built for the United States Navy during World War I. Was the first U.S. Vessel to enter the Austro-German base at Cattaro after the signing of the armistice. On December 22, 1918 the ship left in a convoy from Corfu to Malta.

Bermuda to New York race

Captained by Lieutenant commander Joseph L. Day won the Bermuda to New York race in 56 hours and 56 minutes beating the former record by 8 hours and 43 minutes.   The race was between six submarine Chasers 90, 129, 131, 217, 224, 351. During the race one ship had mechanical difficulties when USS SC 129 broke a crankshaft and with only two engines was disqualified under the race rules.

Bibliography 
Notes

References 

  
  
  
 - Total pages: 184 
  

 

SC-1-class submarine chasers  
World War I patrol vessels of the United States